Michael Joseph Freeman (born October 13, 1961) is a former professional American football player who played guard for four seasons for the Denver Broncos and the Los Angeles Raiders.

1961 births
Living people
People from Mount Holly, New Jersey
Players of American football from New Jersey
American football offensive guards
Arizona Wildcats football players
Denver Broncos players
Los Angeles Raiders players
Denver Dynamite (arena football) players